Eidsvold may refer to:

 A pre-1918 spelling of Eidsvoll, a town in Norway
 HNoMS Eidsvold, a Norwegian coast defence ship, named after the town, and sunk in World War II
 Eidsvold, Queensland, a town in Queensland, Australia
 Eidsvold Township, Lyon County, Minnesota, a township in Minnesota, United States